In Platonism, Dianoia (Greek: διάνοια) is the human cognitive capacity for, process of, or result of discursive thinking, specifically about mathematical and technical subjects. It stands in contrast to the immediate, cognitive process of intuitive apprehension or noesis (noesis).

See also
Epistemology
Theory of Forms

Concepts in epistemology
Platonism
Thought